Karel Nováček was the defending champion but chose to compete in Hilversum at the same week, winning the tournament.

Pete Sampras won the title by defeating Alberto Mancini 6–3, 7–5, 6–3 in the final. It was the very first title for Sampras on clay, who will only win 3 titles on this surface in his entire career (the others were Rome in 1994 and Atlanta in 1998).

Seeds
All seeds received a bye to the second round.

Draw

Finals

Top half

Section 1

Section 2

Bottom half

Section 3

Section 4

References

External links
 Official results archive (ATP)
 Official results archive (ITF)

Singles
Austrian Open Kitzbühel